Joshua Simon Kennet (born 27 September 1987) is an English-Israeli footballer currently with London Lions.

Early and personal life
Kennet is Jewish, and was born to a Jewish family in Camden, England. His father Eilon was born in Israel, and manages London Maccabi Lions A. Josh grew up in North London, and attended Jewish Free School (JFS) in Kingsbury. He showed early signs of ability in most sports particularly in football. He represented London schools in football and athletics. Kennet's brother, Ricky, plays for London Lions and represented the United Kingdom at the 2007 European Maccabiah Games in Rome, Italy.

Kennet has also become an Israeli citizen.

Playing career 
After spells at Millwall and Tottenham Hotspur from the age of 14 to 16, Kennet signed a 2-year YTS contract with Oxford United. From the age of 16 Kennet was a regular in the reserve side for the following two years. Throughout this period Kennet captained the youth side. He was then given his first professional contract at the age of 18 by manager Darren Patterson. On 1 January 2007 Kennet made his league debut for Oxford against Exeter City. However, his first over-enthusiastic tackle earned him a yellow card, but minutes later Kennet redeemed himself by slotting a ball through for an assist for Carl Pettefer. After the arrival of Jim Smith, opportunities in the first team were few and far between and Kennet spent most of his time on the bench and playing regularly for the reserves. When an opportunity for a loan spell at neighbouring Didcot Town arose, Kennet took the opportunity and finished the season as Didcot Town star player.

In 2007, Kennet signed a 3-year contract for Israeli premier league club Maccabi Herzliya after impressing during a two-week trial.

On 3 October 2008 Kennet was named to a preliminary list of 23 players to represent the United Kingdom at the 2009 Maccabiah Games. He played for the United Kingdom in Israel at the 2013 Maccabiah Games, and at the 2017 Maccabiah Games, winning a silver medal.

Career statistics

See also
List of select Jewish football (association; soccer) players

References

External links
 
 

1987 births
Living people
Footballers from the London Borough of Camden
English footballers
Jewish footballers
Association football midfielders
Association football fullbacks
Oxford United F.C. players
Didcot Town F.C. players
Maccabi Herzliya F.C. players
Wingate & Finchley F.C. players
London Lions F.C. players
National League (English football) players
Israeli Premier League players
Liga Leumit players
Isthmian League players
Maccabiah Games silver medalists for Great Britain
Maccabiah Games medalists in football
Competitors at the 2009 Maccabiah Games
Competitors at the 2013 Maccabiah Games
Competitors at the 2017 Maccabiah Games
English Jews
British emigrants to Israel
English expatriate footballers